is a Japanese tennis coach and former professional player.

Biography
Born in Yokohama, Masuda was a two-time national singles champion at the All Japan Tennis Championships, winning back to back titles in 1993 and 1994.

Masuda made all of his ATP Tour main draw appearances in his home country, featuring at the Japan Open on five occasions and once at the Tokyo Indoor. He played in the qualifiers at the 1997 Australian Open and 1998 Wimbledon Championships.

Following his retirement he has coached several Japanese players including Yasutaka Uchiyama and Akiko Omae. He has also been a coach for the Japan Davis Cup team.

References

External links
 
 

1971 births
Living people
Japanese male tennis players
Japanese tennis coaches
Sportspeople from Yokohama
20th-century Japanese people